Saidabad (also Romanized as Saʿīdābād) is a village in Mazraeh Now Rural District, in the Central District of Ashtian County, Markazi Province, Iran. At the 2006 census, its population was 20, in 5 families.

References 

Populated places in Ashtian County